Phillip John Kitching (born 30 September 1967) is an English former professional footballer who played as a midfielder in the Football League for York City, in non-League football for Harrogate Town,  York Railway Institute, Selby Town and Knaresborough Town, and was on the books of Bradford City without making a league appearance.

References

1967 births
Living people
Footballers from Lewisham
English footballers
Association football midfielders
Bradford City A.F.C. players
York City F.C. players
Harrogate Town A.F.C. players
York Railway Institute A.F.C. players
Selby Town F.C. players
Knaresborough Town A.F.C. players
English Football League players